Enchanted Island is a 1958 Technicolor adventure film distributed by Warner Bros., directed by Allan Dwan, produced by Benedict Bogeaus, and written by Harold Jacob Smith, James Leicester, and Al Stillman. It is based on Herman Melville's novel Typee, which was also the film's working title. The title song, "Enchanted Island", written by Stillman and Robert Allen, was performed on the soundtrack by The Four Lads, who had a hit recording of the song on Columbia Records.

The film started out as an RKO movie, but when RKO went bankrupt, it was released by Warner Bros. Enchanted Island was also the next-to-last film directed by Dwan, whose prolific career dated back to 1913. It was the last big-screen appearance of one of the film's stars, Jane Powell.

Plot
Two 19th-century sailors, Abner (Dana Andrews) and Tom (Don Dubbins), jump ship after their captain, Vangs (Ted de Corsia), refuses them shore leave and warns them what a dangerous place this particular island is. They disobey him and soon discover their tropical paradise is a cannibal stronghold.

There are two tribes on the island, one friendly, but the other, the Typee, a cannibal tribe. Jimmy Dooley (Arthur Shields), a white man like themselves, befriends the newcomers and offers them a "hideout," but it turns out Dooley has been hired by Vangs to find his missing men.

Abney becomes acquainted with the beautiful Fayaway (Jane Powell), adopted daughter of the chief, Mehevi (Friedrich von Ledebur), from a long-ago relationship between a shipwrecked sailor and a native girl. When a fight between tribes breaks out, Tom wants to flee but Abner likes island life and the girl. He fights with the Typee and saves Mehevi's life.

Tom takes off, determined to get away, and back to civilization. The chief approves of the love between Abner and Fayaway and permits them to wed. But soon comes the discovery that Tom did not get away, and when Abner and Fayaway interrupt a cannibalistic ritual, they are sentenced to death by Mehevi.

When they try to run, Abner makes it back to the boat but Fayaway does not, a warrior piercing her with a spear. Abner carries her back to the boat and to Vangs, who once again understands why his sailors should never venture onto land.

Cast
 Dana Andrews as Abner "Ab" Bedford 
 Jane Powell as Fayaway 
 Don Dubbins as Tom 
 Arthur Shields as James "Jimmy" Dooley 
 Ted de Corsia as Capt. Vangs 
 Friedrich von Ledebur as Mehevi

Production
In 1944 it was announced that Monogram Pictures were going to make a film of Typee. The film was not made.

In the 1950s John Huston was going to film it with Gregory Peck for Allied Artists (the new name for Monogram). Allied spent a reported $500,000 developing it including a $250,000 commitment to Peck. Then producer Benedict Bogeaus announced he was going to make his own version with Ray Milland, pointing out the novel was in the public domain, claiming he had registered the title and had a script ready from James Leceister, as well as footage of Fiji. Bogeaus signed Edmund Goulding to direct.

Eventually Goulding was replaced with Allan Dwan and Dana Andrews and Jane Powell signed to star. Filming began 21 November 1957 in Puerto Marques, Mexico. RKO agreed to distribute.

References

External links
 
 
 
 
 
Review of film at Variety

1958 films
1958 adventure films
Films directed by Allan Dwan
Films based on American novels
Films based on works by Herman Melville
Films set in Oceania
Films shot in Mexico
Films set on islands
Films about cannibalism
RKO Pictures films
Warner Bros. films
American adventure films
1950s English-language films
1950s American films